The Capital City State Trail is a  paved recreation trail in and around Madison, Wisconsin, with connections to the Military Ridge State Trail and the Badger State Trail. A  segment of the trail goes through the Capital Springs State Recreation Area and a state trail pass is required to bicycle, skate or roller-ski this segment.

The eastern end of the trail is at Nob Hill Rd in Madison.  The western end is at the Southwest Madison Bike Interchange in Arrowhead Park.

External links
Capital City State Trail Wisconsin Department of Natural Resources
Trail Map Wisconsin Department of Natural Resources

Protected areas of Dane County, Wisconsin
Bike paths in Wisconsin